Death in Small Doses is a 1957 American film noir crime film directed by Joseph M. Newman and starring Peter Graves and Mala Powers. A government agent investigates the use of illegal amphetamines among long-haul truck drivers.

Plot
A federal investigator (Peter Graves) poses as a truck driver to check pep-pill usage by long-haul truckers.

Cast  
 Peter Graves as Tom Kaylor
 Mala Powers as Val Owens
 Chuck Connors as Mink Reynolds
 Merry Anders as Amy Phillips
 Roy Engel as Wally Morse
 Robert B. Williams as Dunc Clayton (as Robert Williams)
 Harry Lauter as Steve Hummel
 Pete Kooy as Payson
 Robert Christopher as Lennie Owens

References

External links

Death in Small Doses at TCMDB

1957 films
1957 crime drama films
Allied Artists films
American black-and-white films
American crime drama films
Films about drugs
Films based on newspaper and magazine articles
Films directed by Joseph M. Newman
Films scored by Emil Newman
Trucker films
1950s English-language films
1950s American films